The British Grand Prix is a Formula One motor race.

British Grand Prix can also refer to:

British Grand Prix (athletics), a track and field meeting part of the Diamond League series
British Grand Prix (squash), an annual squash tournament
British motorcycle Grand Prix, a motorcycle race
British Grand Prix Gliding, a gliding competition
Speedway Grand Prix of Great Britain, a speedway event
A1 Grand Prix of Nations, Great Britain, an A1 Grand Prix motor race

See also
British Formula One Championship